The New Zealand national cricket team toured Sri Lanka during the 1998 season, playing three Tests from 27 May to 13 June 1998. New Zealand was led by Stephen Fleming while Sri Lanka was led by Arjuna Ranatunga. Sri Lanka won the Test series 2–1.

Test series summary

1st Test

2nd Test

3rd Test

References

External links
 Tour home at ESPN Cricinfo

1998 in New Zealand cricket
1998 in Sri Lankan cricket
International cricket competitions from 1997–98 to 2000
1998
Sri Lankan cricket seasons from 1972–73 to 1999–2000